Zhanjiang Wuchuan Airport is an airport in Wuchuan, Zhanjiang, Guangdong, China. .
The airport opened on 24 March 2022, replacing the Zhanjiang Airport in Xiashan.

Airlines and destinations

See also
 List of airports in China

References

Airports in Guangdong
Zhanjiang
Airports established in 2022